Gwangmyeong station is a train station in Gwangmyeong, South Korea.

The area surrounding the station is home to the world's second largest IKEA store at 59,000 square meters (640,000 square feet), along with a large Costco store and a Lotte Premium Outlet.

Similarly named stations
"Gwangmyeong station" is the former name of Gwangmyeongsageori station on Line 7 of the Seoul Subway and is also the name of a station on Line 2 of the Pyongyang Metro.

Station layout

History

Construction

The location of Gwangmyeong station was finalised on October 14, 1994, though construction did not begin until December 1999.  The planned name of Namseoul station (literally meaning South Seoul station) was changed to Gwangmyeong station on August 28, 2000, and the station building was completed on March 27, 2004.

Construction cost was 406.8 billion won.

Operation

The station opened with the start of KTX service on April 1, 2004.

After opening in April 2004, Gwangmyeong station was used by only an average 4,521 passengers a day.  However, ridership growth was one of the fastest among KTX stations, and the daily number of KTX passengers arriving or departing at the station reached 14,608 in 2008, surpassing Yongsan station, the Seoul terminus of Honam KTX services.  In the first five years of service, until the end of February 2009, Gwangmyeong Station saw a total of 22,173,792 passenger boardings, again surpassing Yongsan Station.

In passenger surveys conducted in the first months after the launch of KTX service, the problem mentioned most often was the lack of adequate local access for intermediate stations, especially the lack of a subway connection to the two new stations Gwangmyeong and Cheonan-Asan.  Gwangmyeong station was linked to Seoul Subway Line 1 by a shuttle service from Yongsan on December 15, 2006.  However, the shuttle uses the same tracks as the KTX trains, resulting in a schedule with long waiting times between the arrival of KTX and subway trains, thus the service had little impact.  A 2008 survey of KTX passengers arriving or departing at Gwangmyeong station found that 57% used private cars, 11% took a taxi, 28% took a bus, and only 4% took the subway train.

When an additional KTX stop was proposed in 2004 at nearby Yeongdeungpo station, some locals living around Gwangmyeong station feared that Korail would kill Gwangmyeong station by migrating all services to the new station, and formed an action group against the plan. The action group gathered 880,000 signatures, forcing the government to drop the plans in late 2005. When Yeongdeungpo station was made a KTX stop for new services via Suwon starting with November 1, 2010, protests resumed.

Building

Gwangmyeong station is a glass structure surrounded by large car parking spaces. Outside of Exit 1 is a large Costco, and in the same direction one can also access a nearby CJ CGV cinema, the Chung-Ang University Gwangmyeong Hospital, LOTTE Mall Gwangmyeong and the adjacent IKEA Gwangmyeong, the first IKEA store in the Korean Peninsula and second-largest in the world. There are two stories above ground level and two below. The building measures  in terms of internal available space. Originally meant to be the terminus for KTX lines, the size of the station was constructed accordingly. As the terminus changed to Seoul and Yongsan, the large difference between capacity and actual use the station and most prominently due to the size of the station, it has earned the nickname Gwangmyeong Airport by rail enthusiasts.

Services

Gwangmyeong station is served by KTX trains on both the Gyeongbu and Honam KTX services.  Shuttle trains run every 40 min-1 hour to Yeongdeungpo, joining the Gyeongbu Line section of Line 1 at Siheung station in Seoul.  Gwangmyeong station is not connected directly to other subway stations in the city of Gwangmyeong, namely Cheolsan and Gwangmyeongsageori, so it is necessary to change trains at Gasan Digital Complex station in Seoul to travel there, or just take one of the many buses traveling to the station.

Gallery

See also
 Transportation in South Korea

References

External links

 Gwangmyeong Station (Korean)
 Korea Train eXpress
 Route Map
 Station information from Korail

Korea Train Express stations
Railway stations in Gyeonggi Province
Seoul Metropolitan Subway stations
Railway stations opened in 2004
Metro stations in Gwangmyeong